Guanine nucleotide exchange factor VAV3 is a protein that in humans is encoded by the VAV3 gene.

This gene is a member of the VAV gene family. The VAV proteins are guanine nucleotide exchange factors (GEFs) for Rho family GTPases that activate pathways leading to actin cytoskeletal rearrangements and transcriptional alterations. This gene product acts as a GEF preferentially for RhoG, RhoA, and to a lesser extent, RAC1, and it associates maximally with the nucleotide-free states of these GTPases. Alternatively spliced transcript variants encoding different isoforms have been described for this gene.

Interactions
VAV3 has been shown to interact with Grb2.

See also
 Actin
 Cytoskeleton
 GTPase

References

Further reading

Genes on human chromosome 1